The 1963 Soviet Chess Championship was the 31st edition of USSR Chess Championship. Held from 23 November to 27 December 1963 in Leningrad. The tournament was won by Leonid Stein. The final were preceded by semifinals events at Almaty, Kharkov, Moscow and Sverdlovsk.

Table and results

Playoff

References 

USSR Chess Championships
Championship
Chess
1963 in chess
Chess